Derek Dernell Brown (born April 15, 1971) is a former American football running back. Brown played for four seasons in the National Football League (NFL) for the New Orleans Saints. He started his career at Servite High School in Anaheim, California, and attended the University of Nebraska until 1993.

While at Servite High, a school with other notable football alumni such as Steve Beuerlein, Turk Schonert, and Blaine Nye, he set the Orange County single season rushing record with a mark of over 3,000 yards .

During his NFL career with the Saints he amassed 1,383 yards on 388 carries and scored six touchdowns in 56 games. He also caught 108 passes for 918 yards and three touchdowns. During this span he managed to only fumble the ball five times and returned five kicks for 71 yards.

Statistics

References

External links
Just Sports Stats

Players of American football from California
American football running backs
Nebraska Cornhuskers football players
New Orleans Saints players
People from Banning, California
1971 births
Living people
San Francisco Demons players
Servite High School alumni
Sportspeople from Riverside County, California